Matthias Aebischer (born 18 October 1967 in Schwarzenburg) is a Swiss journalist, moderator and politician of the Social Democratic Party of Switzerland (SP). He is a member of the National Council of Switzerland. In 2017, he sponsored a bill to ban the import of animals that have undergone ritual slaughter.

Education and career 
Matthias Aebischer received early education in Schwarzenburg before going to teacher training college in Bern. He started a teaching career in Ligerz in 1988 and practiced until 1990, when he switched career to journalism and worked with the then Radio Förderband. In 1992, he left Radio Förderband to join Schweizer Radio DRS, working there until 1994 when he moved to Swiss television where he worked on sport. In 2001, he returned to his teaching career and taught Media and Communication at the University of Freiburg, combining the job with his journalism work until 2015, when he left the university. He was an editor and moderator at the Tagesschau and Kassensturz and hosted a TV show Club from August 2006 to January 2009. He left journalism (as a reporter for thedaily News) in 2011 when he ran for a National Council seat. He is a member and leader of several professional bodies and foundations, including Pro Velo Schweiz (a cyclists' interest group), where he served as president; the Swiss Association for Further Education (SVEB); and Cinésuisse, the umbrella body for the Swiss film and audiovisual industry .

Political career 
Aebischer was first elected to the National Council on 23 October 2011 on the ticket of SP, to represent the canton of Bern. In 2017, he introduced a bill to ban import of animals that had undergone ritual slaughter into the country. The bill faced opposition mostly from French-speaking Swiss consumers of such meat. He was re-elected to the Council in 2019 and serves on multiple Commissions, including Transport and Telecommunications, Science (chairman 2014–2015), Education and Culture and currently serves as president of Judiciary Commission (2022–2023).

Family life 
Aebischer is a divorced father of four daughters, and lives in Bern. He is linked with the GLP national councillor Tiana Angelina Moser.

References 

Living people
1967 births
Swiss journalists
21st-century Swiss politicians
Social Democratic Party of Switzerland politicians
Members of the National Council (Switzerland)